Marie Geneviève van Goethem (or Goetham or Goeuthen; born 7 June 1865) was a French ballet student and dancer with the Paris Opera Ballet, and the model for Edgar Degas's statue Little Dancer of Fourteen Years (La Petite Danseuse de Quatorze Ans).

Early life

Marie was the daughter of a laundress and a tailor, who came to Paris in the early 1860s from Belgium.  She was born in 1865 in the diverse 9th arrondissement of Paris. Marie's oldest sister, Antoinette, was born in Brussels in 1861.  A second older sister, also named Marie, died eighteen days after her birth in 1864. Marie's younger sister, Louise Joséphine, born in Paris in 1870, adopted the name of Charlotte and died there in 1945. Her father died at some point between 1870 and 1880, leaving Madame van Goethem to fend for her three daughters on a laundress's income.

In 1865, the year Marie was born, the family moved to a stone apartment building on 'Rue Notre-Dame de Lorette' called 'Place Bréda' near Degas's studio on 'Rue Saint-Georges'. The Bréda district was one of the city's poorest and most squalid areas for prostitution. In 1880, after frequently changing their place of residence (an indicator of an inability to pay the rent on time) the family settled on 'Rue de Douai' on the lower slopes of Montmartre, a few blocks from Degas's studio, then located on 'Rue Fontaine'.  

In 1878, Marie and Charlotte were accepted into the dance school of the Paris Opéra, where Antoinette was employed as an extra.  In 1880 Marie passed the examination admitting her to the corps de ballet of the Paris Opera Ballet and made her debut on the stage in La Korrigane.

As a young ballet dancer of the time, Marie was expected to give sexual favors to the male patrons who would go backstage and watch the girls practice. This probably led to prostitution further in her life.

Marie and Degas
Between 1878 and 1881, Degas drew, painted and sculpted Marie in artworks including Dancer with Fan, Dancing Lesson, Dancer Resting, numerous preparatory sketches, and most famously in Little Dancer of Fourteen Years. He frequently attended ballet performances at the Paris Opera and often observed classes at the dance school. By posing for Degas, Marie likely earned five to six francs per four-hour sitting.

Sixth Impressionist Exhibition of 1881
When La Petite Danseuse de Quatorze Ans was shown in Paris at the Sixth Impressionist Exhibition of 1881, it received mixed reviews.  Though critics lauded the work as “the only truly modern attempt" at sculpture, the majority were shocked by the piece. They compared the dancer to a monkey and an Aztec, and referred to her as a "flower of precocious depravity" with a face "marked by the hateful promise of every vice" and "bearing the signs of a profoundly heinous character." She looked like a medical specimen, they reported, in part because Degas exhibited the sculpture inside a glass case.

Subsequent life
In the year following the exhibition of the sculpture, Marie's dance career ended as a result of missing many dance classes.  An article in L'Evénement, which preceded the dismissal by two months, reported "Miss van Goeuthen—fifteen years old, has an older sister who is an extra at the Opera and a younger sister in the Opera dance school—consequently she frequents the Martyrs Tavern and the Rat Mort." Neither tavern was a desirable place for a young girl. Though no trace of her subsequent life or death has been found, the historical record indicates her older sister, Antoinette, was jailed just prior to Marie's dismissal for stealing 700 francs from a patron at a tavern and her younger sister, Charlotte, became a dancer of some distinction and teacher at the dance school during her fifty-three-year career with the Paris Opera Ballet.

In fiction, documentary and the arts
Cathy Marie Buchanan's 2013 novel, The Painted Girls, presents a fictionalized account of the life of Marie van Goethem, as does Carolyn Meyer's young adult novel Marie, Dancing  and Laurence Anholt's children's picture book Degas and the Little Dancer. A non-fiction work by Camille Laurens, La petite danseuse de quatorze ans (2017), discusses the dancer, the artist, the work, and its reception. 

The BBC documentary The Private Life of a Masterpiece: Little Dancer Aged Fourteen, produced in 2004, closely examined La Petite Danseuse de Quatorze Ans, the circumstances of Marie's life, and the critical reaction to the sculpture.  

A fictionalized account of Marie's life is the subject of the new musical Marie, Dancing Still (previously titled Little Dancer). Written by Stephen Flaherty (music) and Lynn Ahrens (book and lyrics), the musical made its world premiere at the Eisenhower Theater at the John F. Kennedy Center for the Performing Arts in 2014. Directed and choreographed by Susan Stroman, the production was headlined by New York City Ballet principal dancer Tiler Peck as young Marie, Rebecca Luker as the adult Marie, and Boyd Gaines as Degas. A revised production, also directed by Stroman, played the 5th Avenue Theatre in 2018. Peck returned to the role of young Marie, with Louise Pitre as adult Marie and Terrence Mann as Degas.

References

External links
Little Dancer of Fourteen Years sculpture at the Metropolitan Museum of Art.
"Degas' dancers have stories to tell" by Mary Louise Schumacher, Milwaukee Journal Sentinel
The world of the little dancer by Richard Kendall, Michigan State University.
"Degas and His Dancers" by Paul Trachtman in Smithsonian Magazine.
Degas: The Artist's Mind, exhibition catalog from The Metropolitan Museum of Art fully available online as PDF, which contains material on Marie van Goethem (see index)
"Kennedy Center Production of Little Dancer", Kennedy Center News Release.

1865 births
19th-century French women
French artists' models
French ballerinas
French people of German descent
Paris Opera Ballet dancers
Models from Paris
Year of death unknown
People of Montmartre
19th-century French ballet dancers